23 Serpnia is a station on Kharkiv Metro's Oleksiivska Line. The station is one of two new stations added to the metro system on 21 August 2004, the other being Botanichnyi Sad.

Kharkiv Metro stations
Railway stations opened in 2004
2004 establishments in Ukraine